The Great Synagoge in Berehove in Ukraine, Zakarpattia Oblast
was built in the late 19th century. It was not destroyed during World War II and used as a synagogue until 1959, when it was confiscated by the Soviet authorities. The interior was converted into a theatre and cultural centre. A concrete shell was built around the building; though the original building was kept intact, it could no longer be seen. Today the front of it is covered with a huge drapery, showing a picture of the original front.

See also
 List of synagogues in Ukraine

References

Former synagogues in Ukraine
19th-century synagogues
Buildings and structures in Zakarpattia Oblast